Rousseau, Nature, and the Problem of the Good Life is a 1999 analysis of Jean-Jacques Rousseau's works, written by Laurence D. Cooper.

References

External links 

 

1999 non-fiction books
English-language books
Philosophy books
Penn State University Press books
Works about Jean-Jacques Rousseau